Plainsong may refer to:

Music 
 Plainsong, the body of traditional songs used in the liturgies of the Roman Catholic Church
 Plainsong, a musical group fronted by Iain Matthews
 "Plainsong", track 1 of Disintegration, a 1989 album by The Cure
 "Plainsong", track 5 of Quique, a 1993 album by Seefeel

Novels 
  Plainsong, a 1990 novel by Deborah Grabien
 Plainsong, a 1999 novel by Kent Haruf
 The Fast Red Road, a 2000 novel by Stephen Graham Jones subtitled A Plainsong

Movie 
 Plainsong, a 2004 TV movie starring Aidan Quinn